Kennet Avenue or West Kennet Avenue is a prehistoric site in the English county of Wiltshire. It was an avenue of two parallel lines of stones 25m wide and 2.5 km in length, which ran between the Neolithic sites of Avebury and The Sanctuary.

Excavations by Stuart Piggott and Alexander Keiller in the 1930s indicated that around 100 pairs of standing stones had lined the avenue, dated to around 2200 BC from finds of Beaker burials beneath some of them. Many stones have fallen or are missing, however.  A second avenue, called Beckhampton Avenue, led west from Avebury towards Beckhampton Long Barrow.

Maud Cunnington righted some of the stones during her work there in the early 20th century. Keiller restored the northern third of the avenue in 1934–1935.

The avenue is within the Avebury section of the Stonehenge and Avebury World Heritage Site. It is in the freehold ownership of the National Trust, and a scheduled monument in English Heritage guardianship. It is managed by the National Trust on behalf of English Heritage, and the two organisations share the cost of managing and maintaining the property.

Images

References

External links

 

Ancient trackways in England
English Heritage sites in Wiltshire
History of Wiltshire
Archaeological sites in Wiltshire
Megalithic monuments in England
Stone Age sites in England